Caleb Michael David Houstan (born January 9, 2003) is a Canadian professional basketball player for the Orlando Magic of the National Basketball Association (NBA). He played college basketball for the Michigan Wolverines. Houstan was a consensus five-star recruit and one of the top players in the 2021 class. He won a silver medal with Canada at the 2019 FIBA Under-16 Americas Championship.

High school career
For his first three years, Houstan attended Montverde Academy in Montverde, Florida. On July 17, 2020, Houstan announced he would forgo his senior year, graduate from high school early, and reclassify to class of 2021. As a freshman, he helped lead the Eagles to a 22–3 record and the semifinal of the prep national championship. As a sophomore, he averaged 10 points, 3.5 rebounds and 1.2 assists while shooting 53.1 percent on 3-pointers, helping lead the Eagles to a perfect 25–0 record, and ranked No. 1 in the country, before the season was cancelled due to the COVID-19 pandemic.  Despite the season being cut short, Montverde was declared the prep national champions. He was the only non-senior to start on a roster with talented players such as Scottie Barnes, Cade Cunningham, Moses Moody, Day'Ron Sharpe, and Zeb Jackson. 

As a junior, he helped lead the Eagles to a 21–1 record, and the No. 1 seed in the inaugural NIBC tournament. Montverde Academy defeated Sunrise Christian Academy 61–57 to win the NIBC championship. On February 5, 2021, Sunrise Christian Academy defeated Montverde Academy 66–69 in overtime, ending high school basketball's longest win streak at 44 games. Houstan led Montverde with 19 points and 10 rebounds.

Houstan was named to the 2021 McDonald's All-American Boys Game and Jordan Brand Classic rosters, becoming the first Michigan signee to earn the distinction since Daniel Horton in 2002. Due to the COVID-19 pandemic, the McDonald's All-American Game and Jordan Brand Classic were not played for the second consecutive year.

Recruiting
On October 30, 2020, Houstan announced his commitment to playing college basketball for Michigan over offers from Alabama, Duke and Virginia. He was the No. 2 rated player in the state of Florida, and was ranked the No. 14 overall prospect in the nation according to 247Sports, and No. 4 power forward, becoming Michigan's highest-rated recruit in the modern recruiting era. Michigan's 2021 recruiting class was ranked No. 1 in the nation by 247Sports, ESPN and Rivals.

College career
On February 23, 2022, Houstan scored a career-high 21 points in a 71–62 win over Rutgers. As a freshman, he averaged 10.1 points, four rebounds, and 1.4 assists per game. Following the season, Houstan declared for the 2022 NBA draft while maintaining his college eligibility. However, on June 1, 2022, he announced that he would remain in the draft and forego his remaining eligibility.

Professional career

Orlando Magic (2022–present)
Houstan was drafted 32nd overall by the Orlando Magic in the 2022 NBA draft. Houstan joined the Magic in the 2022 NBA Summer League. In his Summer League debut, he scored twenty points on 7-for-12 shooting from the field, including 5-for-9 from the three-point line. On July 11, 2022, Houstan signed a rookie contract with the Magic.

Houstan appeared as the first player off the bench in the season opener against the  Detroit Pistons on October 19, but went scoreless with three rebounds and a blocked shot in 21:55. He made his first career start in place of the injured Mo Bamba on November 28 in a game against the Brooklyn Nets, and recorded seven rebounds in 30:52.

National team career
Houstan represented Canada at the 2019 FIBA Under-16 Americas Championship in Belém, Brazil. He started all six games, led Team Canada in scoring, and ranked second overall in the tournament, averaging 22.8 points while adding 5.3 rebounds, two assists, and 1.7 steals per game, and helped his team win the silver medal. In the semifinals against Dominican Republic, Houstan led Canada with 29 points, breaking the record for most points in a game by a Canadian at the FIBA Americas Under-16 Championship. Following his outstanding performance, Houstan was named to the All-Star Five as well as All-Tournament team.

Houstan was scheduled to represent Canada at the 2020 U17 World Cup and U18 FIBA Americas Championship, however, both events were postponed due to the COVID-19 pandemic. Houstan represented Canada at the 2021 FIBA Under-19 Basketball World Cup, where he averaged 17 points, 5.7 rebounds, 2.4 assists, and 2.3 steals per game, to help lead his team to a bronze medal.

Career statistics

College

|-
| style="text-align:left;"| 2021–22
| style="text-align:left;"| Michigan
| 34 || 34 || 32.0 || .384 || .355 || .783 || 4.0 || 1.4 || .7 || .2 || 10.1

References

External links

Michigan Wolverines bio
Montverde Academy Eagles bio

2003 births
Living people
Basketball people from Ontario
Canadian expatriate basketball people in the United States
Canadian men's basketball players
McDonald's High School All-Americans
Michigan Wolverines men's basketball players
Orlando Magic draft picks
Orlando Magic players
Shooting guards
Small forwards
Sportspeople from Mississauga